Dana John Bible (born October 30, 1953) is a former American football coach.

Bible graduated from St. Xavier High School in 1972 and the University of Cincinnati in 1976, where he earned a Bachelor of Arts in economics and in 1982 a Master of Business Administration in management. He has served in various college and National Football League (NFL) coaching positions. He was the offensive coordinator for the Philadelphia Eagles in 1998.

Bible was the quarterbacks and wide receivers coach at North Carolina State University from 1983 to 1985 and returned to NC State as offensive coordinator from 2007 to 2012 under head coach Tom O'Brien, having served as O'Brien's OC at Boston College from 1999 to 2006.

In 2009, Bible was diagnosed with acute promyelocytic leukemia. He retired from coaching on February 12, 2021.

Head coaching record

References

1953 births
Living people
American football defensive backs
Boston College Eagles football coaches
Cincinnati Bearcats football coaches
Cincinnati Bearcats football players
Cincinnati Bengals coaches
Miami RedHawks football coaches
National Football League offensive coordinators
NC State Wolfpack football coaches
Philadelphia Eagles coaches
San Diego State Aztecs football coaches
San Francisco 49ers coaches
Stanford Cardinal football coaches
St. Xavier High School (Ohio) alumni
UCLA Bruins football coaches
Sportspeople from Erie, Pennsylvania
Players of American football from Pennsylvania